Beautiful Suicide is the second studio album from British darkwave band Massive Ego. It was released as a double-disc album on the label Out of Line Music. It is the debut album for both the label, and the new lineup of the band.

Background
The album was recorded throughout 2016, with many tracks also performed live throughout the year, including "Let Go", written by Boy George, a friend of Marc Massive. This would later be announced as the lead single for the album, with a video being recorded in January 2017. Other tracks such as "Drag Me In, Drag Me Under" and "Out of Line" were released on the Out of Line compilation series Electrostorm Vol. 6 and on the Electronic Saviours compilation series Electronic Saviors: Industrial Music to Cure Cancer Vol. 4, respectively. Each being an exclusive mix for each of the compilations.

Older tracks such as "Low Life", originally a collaboration with Empire State Human prior to signing to Out of Line Music, was completely re-recorded for the new album. There are four tracks that have featured vocalists: "For the Blood in Your Veins" featuring label mates Blutengel's Chris Pohl; "Haters Gonna Hate", with German gothic rapper Belzebub; Maggie K DeMonde of Scarlet Fantastic on "Low Life"; and Gene Serene (who has collaborated with Lloyd Price's side project The Frixion) takes the place of Holly Pearl on a new version of "Out of Line".

The album's prologue, "Ghost in My Dream", was written by Price, and samples an interview of Nick Rhodes. The orchestral epilogue was written by Scot Collins, based on the track "I Idolize You". A cover of Hazel O'Connor's "Eighth Day" was recorded for the album, but was then removed from the final track listing.

Prior to the album, Massive Ego had remixed songs for Blutengel and Chrom, who are both on Out of Line Music, and British electronic group Nature of Wires. In return, they remixed tracks that were included on the album.

The title of the album, Beautiful Suicide, was announced in a Christmas message from the band through their social media accounts. The title was originally inspired by a photo by Robert C. Wiles called The Most Beautiful Suicide. The photo shows Evelyn McHale, a young woman of 23, who jumped from the observation deck of the Empire State Building in 1947, landing on a car.

Photography for the album cover and booklet was done by '80s photographer David Levine and SuicideGirls model Honey Manko, who featured in the video for "I Idolize You" in December 2016. The booklet contains a dedication to ex-bandmember Steady (Eddie Orange Dasher), of whom the song "Low Life" was written about. The album was mastered by Chris Pohl and Mario Rühlicke at Fear in Motion Productions, Berlin. The release date was announced when the album was made available through Out of Line Music's website.

To celebrate a year since the release of Beautiful Suicide, the band released Nothing But A Void via their Bandcamp page. It featured two previously unreleased tracks from the album's recording sessions: Eighth Day and the Brando remix of Let Go.

Track listing

Personnel

Marc Massive – vocals, lyrics, art direction
Lloyd Price – keyboards, programming, music
Scot Collins – keyboards, programming, music
Oliver Frost – percussion, art direction
Nick Rhodes – sample (track 1)
Maggie K. DeMonde – featured vocals (track 2)
Manuel Enghuber – featured vocals (track 7)
Chris Pohl – featured vocals (track 8)
Gene Serene – featured vocals (track 10)
Chris Pohl – mixing
Mario Rühlicke – mixing
David Levine – photography
Honey Manko – model
UserDX – sleeve design

References

External links
Official website

2017 albums
Massive Ego albums